Lu Chunlong (born April 8, 1989 in Jiangyin, Jiangsu) is a male Chinese trampoline gymnast who competed in the 2008 Summer Olympics where he won the gold medal. Four years later, at the 2012 London Olympics, Lu won the bronze medal while Dong Dong, the bronze medalist from Beijing, won the competition.

References

 http://2008teamchina.olympic.cn/index.php/personview/personsen/290

External links
 
 
 

1989 births
Living people
Chinese male trampolinists
Gymnasts at the 2008 Summer Olympics
Gymnasts at the 2012 Summer Olympics
Olympic gold medalists for China
Olympic bronze medalists for China
Olympic gymnasts of China
People from Jiangyin
Olympic medalists in gymnastics
Medalists at the 2012 Summer Olympics
Medalists at the 2008 Summer Olympics
Asian Games medalists in gymnastics
Gymnasts at the 2006 Asian Games
Asian Games silver medalists for China
Medalists at the 2006 Asian Games
Medalists at the Trampoline Gymnastics World Championships

Nanjing Sport Institute alumni
Sportspeople from Wuxi
Gymnasts from Jiangsu
20th-century Chinese people
21st-century Chinese people